The Municipality of Isfahan is responsible for the management of the city of Isfahan. The highest-ranking official of this organization is the mayor of Isfahan, who is chosen by the Islamic City Council of Isfahan. The city of Isfahan has 15 administrative divisions and each division has its own mayor, who work under the mayor of Isfahan. The present mayor of Isfahan is Ali Ghasemzadeh.

History 
The municipality of Isfahan was founded in 1907. In that time, it was named Baladiyeh. The council of Baladiyeh appointed Haji Mohammad Ali Khan (The sheriff of Isfahan) as the chief of Baladiyeh, Mirza Mehdi Khan as the deputy and Mirza Abolhasan Khan for official services. But after two weeks, Haji Mohammad Ali Khan was replaced by Mirza Assadollah Vassigholmilk. Baladiyeh had at first only 25 members. In 1911, the Baladiyeh faced a financial crisis because of shortage of income and the chief of Baladieyeh resigned and council of Baladiyeh decided to decrease its range of activities and only look after the provisions of the city.

With the amendment of baladiyeh's law in 1930, the responsibility of choosing mayor was given to the Interior ministry.

Until 1927, Isfahan had only two main streets, Charbagh-e Hezar Jarib street and Charbagh-e Abbassi street, and several broad alleys. from 1935 after giving more powers to the municipality of Isfahan, the municipality decided to rebuild new streets and so Foroughi street, Modarres street, Jomhouri square, Bozorgmehr street and Soroush street were built and the neighborhoods Hatef, hafez, Sepah and Neshat were changed gradually to streets. In 1941 with allocating oil income to the municipality and increasing its income, the streets of Isfahan were asphalted and several garbage trucks were purchased.

Organizational structures 
 Deputy of administration and finance
 Deputy of research planning and IT
 Deputy of transportation and traffic
 Deputy of civil services
 Deputy of city planning and architecture
 Deputy of urban development 
 Deputy of cultural and social affairs
 Deputy of coordination of districts
 Municipalities of the 15 districts

Dependent organizations 

 Fire and safety services
 Cemeteries
 Parks and green spaces
 Terminals
 Motorized services
 Development
 Subway
 Taxi services
 markets and regulation of occupations
 Designing
 Renovation and improvements
 Bus services
 Waste management
 Culture and Recreation
 IT and communication
 Beautification
 Transportation and cargo
 Sport

Isfahan’s Sister Cities 
 Xi’an
 Kuala Lumpur
 Florence
 Saint Petersbourg
 Iași
 Barcelona
 Yerevan
 Kuwait
 Fribourg
 Havana
 Lahore
 Dakar
 Baalbek

See also 
Adib Astronomy Teaching Centre

References 

Isfahan